Vladimir Kononenko (born 12 October 1971) is a former Russian football player.

References

1971 births
Living people
Soviet footballers
FC Chernomorets Novorossiysk players
Russian footballers
FC Kuban Krasnodar players
Russian Premier League players
FC Spartak-UGP Anapa players
Association football defenders
FC Amur Blagoveshchensk players